Loudonville is a village in Ashland and Holmes counties in the U.S. state of Ohio. The population was 2,641 at the 2010 census. Loudonville is nicknamed the "Canoe Capital of Ohio" for the many canoe liveries along the Mohican River. It is also home to Mohican State Park and Mohican-Memorial State Forest and Landoll's Mohican Castle.

History

Loudonville was laid out in 1814 by James Louden Priest, and named for him. A post office called Loudonville has been in operation since 1820.

Loudonville was the long-time (1913–96) home of The Flxible Company, a manufacturer of motorcycle sidecars, commercial cars (hearses, ambulances, and flower cars), intercity coaches, and city-transit coaches. During World War II, Flxible interrupted its normal production and built instead a variety of war goods. A part of the former Flxible plant was in use as a parts depot and service point for the Motor Coach Industries until December 5, 2014, when all production was shut down.

The town of Loudonville includes three sites on the National Register of Historic Places. These include the Ohio Theatre, which was erected in 1909 under the name of "City Hall and Opera House". The theatre had a troubled history, and was almost closed in the 1900s, but three freshmen from the Loudonville High School raised $4,000 in a local talent show. In 2009, the Ohio Theater celebrated its 100th anniversary. The home of Phillip J. Black located at 303 N. Water Street is also listed on the National Register of Historic Places. Built in 1856, it is now home to the Blackfork Inn Bed & Breakfast.

Geography
Loudonville is located at  (40.635850, −82.232959), along the Black Fork of the Mohican River.

Demographics

2010 census
As of the census of 2010, there were 2,641 people, 1,071 households, and 680 families living in the village. The racial makeup of the village was 97.8% White, 0.6% African American, 0.1% Native American, 0.4% Asian, 0.6% from other races, and 0.5% from two or more races. Hispanic or Latino of any race were 1.0% of the population.

There were 1,071 households, of which 29.5% had children under the age of 18 living with them, 48.7% were married couples living together, 11.0% had a female householder with no husband present, 3.7% had a male householder with no wife present, and 36.5% were non-families. 30.0% of all households were made up of individuals, and 17.7% had someone living alone who was 65 years of age or older. The average household size was 2.35 and the average family size was 2.87.

The median age in the village was 43 years. 22.2% of residents were under the age of 18; 7.2% were between the ages of 18 and 24; 23% were from 25 to 44; 27.7% were from 45 to 64; and 20% were 65 years of age or older. The gender makeup of the village was 46.7% male and 53.3% female.

2000 census
As of the census of 2000, there were 2,906 people, 1,189 households, and 763 families living in the village. The population density was 1,168.8 people per square mile (450.6/km2). There were 1,264 housing units at an average density of 508.4 per square mile (196.0/km2). The racial makeup of the village was 98.93% White, 0.03% Native American, 0.21% Asian, 0.17% from other races, and 0.65% from two or more races. Hispanic or Latino of any race were 0.52% of the population.

There were 1,189 households, out of which 30.0% had children under the age of 18 living with them, 51.0% were married couples living together, 9.9% had a female householder with no husband present, and 35.8% were non-families. 31.5% of all households were made up of individuals, and 13.9% had someone living alone who was 65 years of age or older. The average household size was 2.34 and the average family size was 2.94.

In the village, the population was spread out, with 24.6% under the age of 18, 6.6% from 18 to 24, 27.3% from 25 to 44, 22.9% from 45 to 64, and 18.5% who were 65 years of age or older. The median age was 39 years. For every 100 females there were 94.9 males. For every 100 females age 18 and over, there were 88.3 males.

The median income for a household in the village was $36,273, and the median income for a family was $42,500. Males had a median income of $31,225 versus $23,807 for females. The per capita income for the village was $16,831. About 9.7% of families and 13.2% of the population were below the poverty line, including 24.3% of those under age 18 and 5.0% of those age 65 or over.

Education
Loudonville's three schools comprise the Loudonville-Perrysville Exempted Village School District. First through third graders attend the R.F. McMullen School. Fourth through Sixth graders attend the nearby C.E. Budd School, a building that once served as the village's high school. Students then transition to the Loudonville High School campus, which includes the seventh and eight grades. The high school colors are red and gray and the athletic teams are known as the "Redbirds".

Gallery

Notable people
 Mary Crow – poet and professor
 Charles F. Kettering – inventor of the automobile self-starter, founder of Delco Electronics
 Ron Zook – head football coach at University of Illinois and University of Florida

References

External links

 Cleo Redd Fisher Museum of the Mohican Historical Society
 The Historic Ohio Theatre (Opera House)
 Village website
 Community website
 Loudonville-Perrysville Exempted Village School District
 

Villages in Ashland County, Ohio
Villages in Holmes County, Ohio
Villages in Ohio
1814 establishments in Ohio
Populated places established in 1814